The Text of Light is a 1974 American experimental film directed by Stan Brakhage.

Synopsis 
Time-lapse photography of books, paintings, reflections, and light falling on textures, shot entirely through a glass ashtray.

Reception

References

External links 
 

1974 films
Films directed by Stan Brakhage
1970s avant-garde and experimental films
1970s American films